Chia seeds are the edible seeds of Salvia hispanica, a flowering plant in the mint family (Lamiaceae) native to central and southern Mexico, or of the related Salvia columbariae of the southwestern United States and Mexico. The seeds are hygroscopic, absorbing up to 12 times their weight in liquid when soaked and developing a mucilaginous coating that gives chia-based foods and beverages a distinctive gel texture.

There is evidence that the crop was widely cultivated by the Aztecs in pre-Columbian times and was a staple food for Mesoamerican cultures. Chia seeds are cultivated on a small scale in their ancestral homeland of central Mexico and Guatemala and commercially throughout Central and South America.

Description 

They are mottle-colored with brown, gray, black, and white. The seeds are hydrophilic, absorbing up to 12 times their weight in liquid when soaked; they develop a mucilaginous coating that gives them a gel texture. Chia (or chian or chien) has mostly been identified as Salvia hispanica L. Other plants referred to as "chia" include "golden chia" (Salvia columbariae). The seeds of Salvia columbariae are used for food.

In the 21st century, chia is grown and consumed commercially in its native Mexico and Guatemala, as well as Bolivia, Argentina, Ecuador, Nicaragua, and Australia. New patented varieties of chia have been developed in Kentucky for cultivation in northern latitudes of the United States.

Seed yield varies depending on cultivars, mode of cultivation, and growing conditions by geographic region.

History

S. hispanica is described and pictured in the Codex Mendoza''' and the Florentine Codex,  Aztec codices created between 1540 and 1585. Tribute records from the Mendoza Codex, Matrícula de Tributos, and the Matricula de Huexotzinco (1560), along with colonial cultivation reports and linguistic studies, detail the geographic location of the tributes and provide some geographic specificity to the main S.hispanica''-growing regions. Most of the provinces grew the plant, except for areas of lowland coastal tropics and desert say, and it was given as an annual tribute by the people to the rulers in 21 of the 38 Aztec provincial states. The traditional area of cultivation was in a distinct area that covered parts of north-central Mexico, south to Guatemala.  A second and separate area of cultivation, apparently pre-Columbian, was in southern Honduras and Nicaragua.

Chia was given as an annual tribute by the people to the rulers in 21 of the 38 Aztec provincial states. Chia seeds served as a staple food for the Nahuatl (Aztec) cultures. It may have been as important as maize as a food crop. Jesuit chroniclers placed chia as the third-most important crop in the Aztec culture, behind only corn and beans, and ahead of amaranth. Offerings to the Aztec priesthood were often paid in chia seed. 

Ground or whole chia seeds are used in Argentina, Bolivia, Guatemala, Mexico, and Paraguay for nutritious drinks and food. Today, chia is cultivated on a small scale in its ancestral homeland of central Mexico and Guatemala, and commercially in Argentina, Bolivia, Ecuador, Guatemala, and Mexico.

Nutrition
Dried chia seeds contain 6% water, 42% carbohydrates (including a high content of dietary fiber), 16% protein, and 31% fat (table). In a  reference amount, chia seeds are a rich source (20% or more of the Daily Value, DV) of the B vitamins, thiamin and niacin (54% and 59% DV, respectively), and a moderate source of riboflavin (14% DV) and folate (12% DV). The seeds are rich in several dietary minerals, including calcium, iron, magnesium, manganese, phosphorus, and zinc (all more than 20% DV; table).

The fats of chia seed oil are mainly unsaturated, with linoleic acid (17–26% of total fat) and α-linolenic acid (50–57%) as the major fatty acids.

As food

Chia seeds may be added to other foods as a topping or put into smoothies, breakfast cereals, energy bars, granola bars, yogurt, tortillas, and bread.

They also may be made into a gelatin-like substance or consumed raw. The gel from ground seeds may be used in place of eggs in cakes while providing other nutrients, and is a common substitute in vegan and allergen-free baking.

Unlike flax seeds, whole chia seeds can but do not need to be ground to increase nutrient bioavailability because the seed coat is delicate and easily breaks apart when exposed to moisture. For this reason they are typically prepared with liquid foods.

In Europe
Chia is considered a novel food in Europe as it does not have "a significant history of consumption within the European Union before 15May 1997", according to the Advisory Committee of Novel Foods and Processes. Under this rule, chia seeds may be 5% of total matter in bread products. Pre-packaged Chia seeds shall carry additional labelling to inform the consumer that the daily intake is no more than 15 grams per day and pure chia oil only 2 grams per day.

Chia seeds sold in the EU are imported mainly from South American and Central American countries, and require inspections for levels of pesticides, contaminants and microbiological criteria.

Preliminary health research
Preliminary research remains sparse and inconclusive. In a 2015 systematic review, most of the studies did not show an effect of chia seed consumption on cardiovascular risk factors in humans.

Drug interactions
No evidence to date indicates consuming chia seeds has adverse effects on, or interacts with, prescription drugs.

Chia pet

Joe Pedott created a set of terracotta figurines called Chia Pet used to sprout chia. The first figurines were made in 1977, and they were marketed widely after 1982. During the 1980s in the United States, the first substantial wave of chia seed sales was tied to chia pets, clay figures that serve as the base for a sticky paste of chia seeds. After the figures are watered, the seeds sprout into a form suggesting a fur covering.

About 500,000 chia pets were sold in the U.S. in 2007 as novelties or house plants, to a total of 15 million as of 2019, with most sales occurring during the holiday season.

References

External links 

Edible nuts and seeds
Salvia
Seeds
Crops originating from Pre-Columbian North America
Crops originating from indigenous Americans
Crops originating from Mexico
Crops originating from the United States
Plants used in Native American cuisine